The 2011 ATP Challenger Guangzhou was a professional tennis tournament played on hard courts. It was the second edition of the tournament which was part of the 2011 ATP Challenger Tour. It took place in Guangzhou, China between 14 and 20 March 2011.

ATP entrants

Seeds

 Rankings are as of March 7, 2011.

Other entrants
The following players received wildcards into the singles main draw:
  Gong Maoxin
  Li Zhe
  Wu Di
  Zhang Ze

The following entrant has been granted a Special Exemption into the main draw:
  Cedrik-Marcel Stebe

The following players received entry from the qualifying draw:
  Tiago Fernandes
  Colin Fleming
  Sadik Kadir
  Benjamin Mitchell

Champions

Singles

 Uladzimir Ignatik def.  Alexander Kudryavtsev, 6–4, 6–4

Doubles

 Mikhail Elgin /  Alexander Kudryavtsev def.  Sanchai Ratiwatana /  Sonchat Ratiwatana, 7–6(3), 6–3

External links
ITF Search
ATP official site

ATP Challenger Guangzhou
China International Guangzhou
2011 in Chinese tennis